Title Tracks is an American power pop/indie rock solo project from Washington, D.C.-based musician John Davis (formerly of Q and Not U and Georgie James).

History

In early 2008, although still a member of the band Georgie James, Davis began writing the songs that would form the basis for his first solo record.  By the time Georgie James announced its dissolution in the summer of 2008, Davis had already written an album's worth of songs and called his new solo project Title Tracks.  He put together a live version of the band that included Michael Cotterman on bass, Andrew Black on drums (both of whom had played in the primary live version of Georgie James) and Merideth Munoz on guitar, keyboards and vocals.

In the fall of 2008, that version of the band recorded two songs, "Every Little Bit Hurts" and "Found Out," with producer Chad Clark at Silver Sonya Studios in Washington, D.C.  The single was released in April 2009 by Dischord Records.

In January 2009, Davis commenced recording the debut Title Tracks full-length.  The basic tracks were recorded at his practice space in NE Washington, D.C. Nick Anderson engineered and co-produced, along with Davis and Chad Clark.  Additional tracking was done at Silver Sonya Studio and The National Crayon Museum.  Davis played all of the instruments on the record, with the exception of Kriston Capps, who contributed saxophone to the song "No, Girl." Tracyanne Campbell, of the band Camera Obscura, sang on the tracks "No, Girl" and "Tougher Than The Rest" (a cover of a Bruce Springsteen song).  The album, It Was Easy, was released in February 2010 by The Ernest Jenning Record Co.

By the time of the album's release, Munoz had left the group and Anderson replaced her in the live version of the group.  North American touring commenced in February 2010 and ran through May 2010.  Title Tracks toured with Pretty & Nice and Ted Leo and the Pharmacists.  In August 2010, Title Tracks pared its live band down to a trio of Davis, Cotterman and Black.  This lineup recorded an album in the fall of 2010, In Blank, which was released in April 2011.

After more than five years without a new release, Title Tracks issued its third full-length album, Long Dream, in November 2016.

Releases

Albums
 It Was Easy (The Ernest Jenning Record Co./Safety Meeting Records, February 2010)
 In Blank (The Ernest Jenning Record Co./Windian Records, April 2011)
 Long Dream (The Ernest Jenning Record Co., November 2016)

Singles
 Every Little Bit Hurts/Found Out (Dischord Records, 2009)

References

External links
Title Tracks live on KEXP, March 2010
Title Tracks live at WAMU, September 2016

Indie rock musical groups from Washington, D.C.
American power pop groups
Musical groups established in 2008
2008 establishments in Washington, D.C.